The Art of Coarse Acting is a 1964 humorous book on amateur theatre by British journalist Michael Green, following the success of his The Art of Coarse Rugby in 1960.

Green describes a coarse actor as:

Green had a friend called Askew, with whom he had wrecked many a carefully planned production. Askew had a list of parts which enabled him to sneak away to the boozer, thanks to an early exit: Polonius, Lord Scroop, Constable of France, Doolittle, Prince of Aragon, etc., etc. 

Green, who had been involved in amateur theatre in the Midlands and London, dedicated the book to the Northampton Drama Club, Northampton Players, The Crescent Theatre, Birmingham, and The Questors Theatre, Ealing, all of whom (with the exception of Northampton Players) are still active. He also acknowledged the help of The Questors Theatre with the illustrations.

References 
Michael Green, Nobody Hurt in Small Earthquake Heinemann, London, 1990, 

1964 non-fiction books
Non-fiction books about acting
Hutchinson (publisher) books